Shabazz is the name of a supposed black architect whose tribe founded the populations of Africa according to the doctrine of the Nation of Islam (NOI). It is similar to the Persian name Shahbaz.

The name was adopted by Malcolm X, initially when he joined the NOI. Born Malcolm Little, by 1949 he was signing letters as "Malachi Shabazz", before taking the name "Malcolm X". After returning from his pilgrimage in Mecca, he finally adopted the title and name El-Hajj Malik El-Shabazz, seen as symbolic of his spiritual journey to Orthodox Islam. The surname was borne by his wife Betty Shabazz and his children, and has also been adopted by unrelated persons.

Origin

A 1994 article in The American Muslim claims that the name is from the Arabic words sha‘b, and ‘azz. There is also a similar (but etymologically unrelated) Persian name, Shahbâz, meaning "royal falcon". Indicating "royalty and nobility", the name is popular with Bosnian, Turkish, Indian and Pakistani Muslims.

In his book Message to the Blackman in America, Elijah Muhammad wrote that African-Americans (then called Negroes) are descended from an ancient tribe by that name:

[God] has declared that we [the so-called Negroes] are descendants of the Asian Black Nation and the tribe of Shabazz.

People
Notable people with the name include:

The family of Malcolm X
Malcolm X or El-Hajj Malik El-Shabazz (1925–1965), an American Muslim minister and human rights activist
Betty Shabazz (1934–1997), his wife
Attallah Shabazz (born 1958), his daughter
Ilyasah Shabazz (born 1962), his daughter
Malcolm Shabazz (1984–2013), his grandson
Qubilah Shabazz (born 1960), his daughter

Rappers
A number of rappers have adopted "Shabazz" as part of their stage names to express an affinity with Malcolm X, The Nation of Islam, or the Black power movement more broadly.
 Shabazz Palaces (Ishmael Butler of Digable Planets)
 Shabazz the Disciple (born 1973), a Wu-Tang Clan affiliate
 Lakim Shabazz of Flavor Unit.

Others
Abdulalim A. Shabazz (born Lonnie Cross, 1927–2014), professor of mathematics
 Ahmad Uthman Shabazz, respondent in O'Lone v. Estate of Shabazz U.S. Supreme Court case
Jamel Shabazz, documentary photographer
K. Malik Shabazz or Ron Killings (born 1972), American professional wrestler
Malik Zulu Shabazz (born 1966), leader of the New Black Panther Party
Menelik Shabazz (1954–2021), Barbados-born British film director
Shabazz Muhammad (born 1992), American basketball player
Shabazz Napier (born 1991), American/Puerto-Rican basketball player

Fictional characters
A character named Shabazz K. Milton Berle appeared in the TV series The Boondocks, in the episode "The Passion of Reverend Ruckus".

See also
 Shabazz (disambiguation)

References

Further reading
 Wehr, Hans & Cowan, J. Milton (Eds.) (1980). Dictionary of Modern Written Arabic. Beirut: Librairie du Liban.

External links
 Online text of Message to the Blackman